Jetfighter: Full Burn is a combat flight simulator video game developed by Mission Studios and published by Interplay Entertainment for MS-DOS in 1998.

Reception

The game received mixed reviews according to the review aggregation website GameRankings.

References

External links
 

1998 video games
Combat flight simulators
DOS games
DOS-only games
Interplay Entertainment games
Multiplayer and single-player video games
Take-Two Interactive games
Video games developed in the United States